Husari is a village in Võru Parish, Võru County, in southeastern Estonia. It has a population of 17 (as of 2011) and an area of 2.3 km².

Husari has a station on currently inactive Valga–Pechory railway.

References

Villages in Võru County